Eoin Farrell (November 1982 – 3 July 2022) was an Irish Gaelic footballer and selector. At club level he played with Maryland and was also a member of the Westmeath senior football team. Farrell usually lined out as a goalkeeper.

Career
Farrell first played Gaelic football at juvenile and underage levels with the Maryland club. He also lined out as a schoolboy with the Marist College in Athlone and was goalkeeper on the team that lost the 1999 Leinster colleges final to Good Counsel College. Farrell first appeared on the inter-county scene as a member of the Westmeath minor football team that beat Dublin to win the 1999 Leinster MFC title. He later lined out at under-21 and senior levels and also played with Athlone Institute of Technology in the Sigerson Cup. Farrell won a Westmeath IFC title with Maryland in 2008. He later served as a selector with the Westmeath minor football team.

Death
Farrell died after a short illness on 3 July 2022, aged 40.

Honours

Maryland
Westmeath Intermediate Football Championship: 2008

Westmeath
Leinster Minor Football Championship: 2000

References

1982 births
2022 deaths
Gaelic football goalkeepers
Gaelic football selectors
Irish accountants
Maryland Gaelic footballers
People educated at Marist College, Athlone
People from Athlone
Westmeath inter-county Gaelic footballers